Chicoreus setionoi is a species of sea snail, a marine gastropod mollusk in the family Muricidae, the murex snails or rock snails.

Description

Distribution
This species occurs in the Arafura Sea.

References

 Houart, R., 2001. Chicoreus (Triplex) setionoi n. sp. (Gastropoda: Muricidae) from Arafura Sea, Pacific Ocean. Novapex 2(4): 145-148

External links
 MNHN, Paris: holotype

Gastropods described in 2001
Chicoreus